John Henry Dick (May 12, 1919 – September 22, 1995) was an American naturalist and wildlife artist who specialized in birds.

Early life
Dick was born in at his parents' townhouse in Brooklyn, New York on May 12, 1919. His parents were William Karl Dick and Madeleine Talmage Force. Madeleine survived the  sinking where her first husband John Jacob Astor IV died, and had a posthumously born son named John Jacob Astor VI with him. Dick also had an elder full brother named William Force Dick.

He grew up in Manhattan and frequently visited the American Museum of Natural History. His great-grandfather, William Dick, was an early investor in the National Sugar Refining Co., of which his father was a director. Dick studied at the Yale School of Art and joined the United States Air Force during World War II, visiting the South Pacific Islands. When the war came to an end he was on Iwo Jima.

Career
John Henry Dick illustrated numerous books on birds including South Carolina Bird Life (1949), Florida Birdlife (1954), The Warblers of America (1957), A Gathering of Shore Birds (1960), Carolina Lowcountry Impressions (1964), A pictorial guide to the birds of the Indian subcontinent (1983) and The Birds of China (1984). He also published an illustrated autobiographical book in 1979 titled Other Edens: The Sketchbook of an Artist Naturalist which won a national conservation award from the Garden Club of America in 1984.

He inherited Dixie Plantation in Charleston County near Meggett from his mother, and lived there from 1947 until his death. The estate beside the Stono River had a variety of habitats on 900 acres where he encouraged birds.  Apart from bird art, he also took an interest in photography and lectured at the Charleston Natural History Society and travelled around the world to observe birds.

Personal life
Dick turned blind towards the end of his life and died on September 22, 1995. He bequeathed his estate to the College of Charleston.

References

External links 
 Archives

1919 births
1995 deaths
American bird artists
American naturalists
20th-century naturalists